Britta Rådström, (born 1954, died 28 July 2015), was a Swedish social democratic politician. She has been a member of the Riksdag since 2004.

She should not be confused with her namesake, a psychology student who married Swedish author Pär Rådström.

References

External links
Britta Rådström at the Riksdag website

Members of the Riksdag from the Social Democrats
2015 deaths
1954 births
Women members of the Riksdag
Members of the Riksdag 2002–2006
21st-century Swedish women politicians